Deighton Calvin Butler (born 14 July 1974) is a West Indies international cricket player and umpire who played five One-day International matches and one Twenty20 international in 2005 and 2006.

Butler has played for Windward Islands from 2000 to 2010 and was primarily a left-arm fast-medium swing bowler. He first played for West Indies in the Indian Oil Cup competition in Sri Lanka in 2005, taking three wickets in three matches. He was later picked for the ODI side in New Zealand in 2006, playing in two matches but failing to take a wicket. He is a useful lower-order batsman.

He played league cricket for Linthwaite in the Drakes Huddersfield Cricket League in England.

He is now an umpire and stood in matches in the 2016–17 Regional Super50 tournament in the West Indies.

References

1974 births
Living people
West Indies One Day International cricketers
West Indies Twenty20 International cricketers
West Indian cricket umpires
Windward Islands cricketers
Saint Vincent and the Grenadines cricketers
People from Saint Vincent (Antilles)